Firman is a surname. Notable people with the surname include:

 Armen Firman (810–887), 9th century inventor
 Bert Firman (1906–1999), English bandleader of the 1920s–1940s
 Brett Firman (born 1976), Australian rugby league footballer
 Conor Firman (born 1998), Irish hurler
 David Firman, English orchestral conductor, musical director and composer
 Humphrey Firman (1886–1916), English recipient of the Victoria Cross
 Natasha Firman (born 1976), English racing driver, sister of Ralph
 Patricia Firman (1922–1980), Australian model, actress and TV personality
 Pete Firman (born 1980), English magician, comedian and television presenter
 Ralph Firman (born 1975), Irish racing driver

See also 
 Firmani